Kani Kusruti (born 12 September 1985) is an Indian actress and model. She first gained recognition in 2009 with the film Kerala Cafe, where her performance was critically acclaimed. Kani won the Best Actress at Kerala State Film Awards in 2020 and the BRICS Best Actress Award at the Moscow International Film Festival for her performance as Khadeeja in the film Biriyaani.

Early life 
Kani was born in Cheruvakkal, a small village in Thiruvananthapuram, Kerala, to social activist and rationalist parents Jayasree A. K. and Maitreya Maitreyan. Her parents had dropped their last names to erase the social hierarchy marker that comes with last names in India. At 15, she invented her last name "Kusruti" (meaning "mischievous" in Malayalam) to fill in a requirement in her class 10th exam application. She grew up in Thiruvananthapuram, where she got introduced to the Abhinaya Theatre Research Centre, "a common platform for theatre practitioners". She later moved to Thrissur, where she enrolled in the theatre arts program at the Thrissur School of Drama, between 2005 and 2007. She completed her theatre education at the L'École Internationale de Théâtre Jacques Lecoq, where she studied physical theatre for two years.

Career 
At Abhinaya, Kusruti made her theatre debut in Baudhayana's classic farce Bhagavadajjukam. She played the lead role of Vasantsena in the production from 2000 to 2006. The play toured across theatre festivals, including the Bharat Rang Mahotsav and the International Theatre Festival of Kerala. She rendered the part of Kamala in M. G. Jyotish's stage adaptation of Hermann Hesse's Siddhartha. In 2007, the production was invited to the Villeneuve en Scene Festival d'Avignon.

In 2009, after returning from L'École Internationale de Théâtre Jacques Lecoq, Kusruti appeared in the anthology film Kerala Cafe, in the segment "Island Express" directed by Shankar Ramakrishnan. In 2010, she played a Naxalite in the Mohanlal starrer Shikkar, but her nuanced rendition of a sex worker in the 2010 film Cocktail got her noticed by mainstream audiences.

In December 2010, Kani collaborated on creating 'Las Indias', a "mega performance event" directed by the thespian and theatre pedagogist Elias Cohen. The performance was staged in a bus, that was designed for the production. The Indo-Latin American theatre company, the Singing Sticks Theatre Ensemble evolved out of Las Indias. The bus that was originally created for Las Indias, was used once again for an interactive theatre roadshow 'Tsunami Express: Highway of Hopes', which Kusruti collaborated on making.

In 2011, Kani joined the renowned touring theatre company Footsbarn to work on a new production of Shakespeare's Tempest. She played Miranda in the resulting performance "The Indian Tempest". After touring Ireland, Spain, France, Portugal and India, the production opened at Shakespeare's Globe in 2013.

Kusruti researched, co-developed and acted in the Indo-Polish production 'Burning Flowers - 7 Dreams of a Woman', directed by Pawel Szkotak and produced by Teatr Biuro Podróży.

In 2015, Kani became a household presence with the soap opera Eswaran Sakshiyayi, directed by K. K. Rajeev. She played the part of Advocate Tresa, a lawyer who joins in on the investigation for her brother's murder.

Awards

Kerala State Film Awards
 2019 - Best Actress - Biriyani

South Filmfare Awards
 2020 - Best Actress (Critics-Malayalam) - Biriyani

Personal life 

Kusruti's mother Dr. Jayasree AK, a community medicine specialist and social activist, lectures at Pariyaram Medical College, and is a regular guest on talk shows. Her father Maitreya Maitreyan has worked for, and led, several human rights movements in Kerala.

She lives in Mumbai with her partner, the filmmaker and science communicator Anand Gandhi. She identifies herself as an atheist and a rationalist. On 19 February 2019, she revealed she quit acting due to sexual demands from filmmakers. The actress has now made serious claims against the Malayalam film industry. Shockingly, Kani has claimed that filmmakers even approached her mom to convince her to give in to their demands. Kani chose to go back to theatre, but she couldn't earn enough in that industry to make a living. 

However, Kani is hopeful about the Malayalam film industry after the #MeToo Movement and initiations like Women in Cinema Collective. In 2019, Kusruti along with 48 other notable artists in the country had written an open letter to Narendra Modi over incidents of lynching in the country.

Filmography

References

External links
 
 
 
 

1985 births
Living people
Actresses from Thiruvananthapuram
Actresses in Malayalam cinema
Indian film actresses
Actresses in Malayalam television
Female models from Thiruvananthapuram
Actresses in Tamil cinema
L'École Internationale de Théâtre Jacques Lecoq alumni
21st-century Indian actresses
Indian rationalists
Indian atheists
Television personalities from Kerala
Women artists from Kerala